The 1976 NCAA Division II football season, part of college football in the United States organized by the National Collegiate Athletic Association at the Division II level, began in August 1976 and concluded with the championship game on December 11 at Memorial Stadium in Wichita Falls, Texas. The Montana State Bobcats defeated the Akron Zips 24–13 in the Pioneer Bowl to win their only Division II national title.

Conference changes and new programs

Conference standings

Conference summaries

Postseason

The 1976 NCAA Division II Football Championship playoffs were the fourth single-elimination tournament to determine the national champion of men's Division II college football. The championship game (Pioneer Bowl) was held at Memorial Stadium in Wichita Falls, Texas for the first time.

Playoff bracket

* Denotes host institution

See also
1976 NCAA Division I football season
1976 NCAA Division III football season
1976 NAIA Division I football season
1976 NAIA Division II football season

References